Soil Moisture and Ocean Salinity (SMOS) is a satellite which forms part of ESA's Living Planet Programme. It is intended to provide new insights into Earth's water cycle and climate. In addition, it is intended to provide improved weather forecasting and monitoring of snow and ice accumulation.

History
The project was proposed in November 1998; in 2004 the project passed ESA-phase "C/D" and, after several delays, it was launched on 2 November 2009 from Plesetsk Cosmodrome on a Rockot rocket. The first data from the MIRAS (Microwave Imaging Radiometer using Aperture Synthesis) instrument was received on 20 November 2009. The SMOS programme cost is about €315 million ($465 million; £280 million). It is led by ESA but with significant input from French and Spanish interests.

The satellite is part of ESA's Earth Explorer programme – satellite missions that are performing innovative science in obtaining data on issues of pressing environmental concern. The first is already complete – a mission called GOCE, which mapped variations in the pull of gravity across the Earth's surface. SMOS was the second Explorer to launch; and was followed by CryoSat-2 (the first CryoSat failed on launch), Swarm (spacecraft), and ADM-Aeolus.

Launcher
The satellite was launched on 2 November 2009 (04:50 (01:50 GMT)) to a nearly circular orbit of 763 km aboard a Rokot, a modified Russian Intercontinental Ballistic Missile (ICBM) SS-19 launched from a decommissioned SS-19 launcher from Northern Russia's  Plesetsk Cosmodrome.  The SMOS satellite was launched together with the Proba-2, a technology demonstration satellite.

Science
The goal of the SMOS mission is to monitor surface soil moisture with an accuracy of 4% (at 35–50 km spatial resolution). This aspect is managed by the HYDROS project.  Project Aquarius will attempt to monitor sea surface salinity with an accuracy of 0.1 psu (10- to 30-day average and a spatial resolution of 200 km x 200 km).

Soil moisture is an important aspect of climate, and therefore forecasting. Plants transpire water from depths lower than 1 meter in many places and satellites like SMOS can only provide moisture content down to a few centimeters, but using repeated measurements in a day, the satellite can extrapolate soil moisture.  The SMOS team of ESA hope to work with farmers around the world, including the United States Department of Agriculture to use as ground-based calibration for models determining soil moisture, as it may help to better understand crop yields over wide regions.

Ocean salinity is crucial to the understanding of the role of the ocean in climate through the global water cycle. Salinity in combination with temperature determine ocean circulation by defining its density and hence thermohaline circulation. Additionally, ocean salinity is one of the variables that regulate CO2 uptake and release and therefore has an effect on the oceanic carbon cycle.
 
Information from SMOS is expected to help improve short and medium-term weather forecasts, and also have practical applications in areas such as agriculture and water resource management. In addition, climate models should benefit from having a more precise picture of the scale and speed of movement of water in the different components of the hydrological cycle.

SMOS has been used to improve hurricane forecasting by collecting hurricane surface-level wind speed data using its novel microwave imaging radiometer, which can penetrate the thick clouds surrounding a cyclone. Hurricanes that have been studied by SMOS include Hurricane Florence, Typhoon Mangkhut, and Typhoon Jebi.

Instrumentation
The SMOS satellite carries a new type of instrument called Microwave Imaging Radiometer with Aperture Synthesis (MIRAS). Some eight metres across, it has the look of helicopter rotor blades; the instrument creates images of radiation emitted in the microwave L-band (1.4 GHz). MIRAS will measure changes in the wetness of the land and in the salinity of seawater by observing variations in the natural microwave emission coming up off the surface of the planet.

Operations and ground segment
The CNES Satellite Operations Ground Segment will operate the spacecraft with telecommunications from ESA's S-band facility located in Kiruna, Sweden. The Data Processing Ground Segment (CDTI, Villafranca, Spain) will process SMOS data through the X-band. Higher level processing of information will be done by scientists globally.

See also

 ESA's Living Planet Programme
 GOCE
 CryoSat & CryoSat-2
 Swarm
 ADM-Aeolus
 EarthCARE
 BIOMASS
 FLEX
 Aquarius payload (NASA)
 Soil Moisture Active Passive satellite
 Proba-2

References

External links
 ESA – SMOS home page
 SMOS on ESA Earth Online
 SMOS CESBIO page
 SMOS on eoPortal
 SMOS Project Germany 
 SMOS Processor Prototype Page 
 SMOS IFREMER Expert Centre
 SMOS Barcelona Expert Centre
SMOS Real Time Tracking - uphere.space

Earth observation satellites of the European Space Agency
Environmental science
Satellite meteorology
Spacecraft launched by Rokot rockets
Spacecraft launched in 2009